Day & Night is the first studio album by Cantopop/Hong Kong English pop singer Janice Vidal, released on 13 May 2005 under the record label Amusic. All the songs are cover version of Leon Lai's songs, some of them in different languages. It contains songs in Cantonese and English.

Original Version

Track listing
In Love Again 我這樣愛你 3'01"
Unspoken Words of Love 情深說話未曾講 4'10" (Cantonese)
不可一世 3'51"
一夜傾情 3'45" (Cantonese)
Chocolate Ice 聽身體唱歌 2'45"
Sugar in the Marmalade 3'23"
夏日傾情 3'06" (Cantonese)
My Eyes Don't Lie 大綱與細節 3'20"
2004 兩個人的煙火 3'28"
Love me A Capella 你很愛我 2'35"
Superman 雙雄
Long Distance 情深說話未曾講 4'10"

2 CD Special Version
A 2 CD Special Version was released on 26 May 2005. In addition to the tracks in the original version, it includes the new song 大哥 (Translated: Big Brother).

Track listing
In Love Again 我這樣愛你 3'01"
Unspoken Words of Love 情深說話未曾講 4'10" (Cantonese)
不可一世 3'51"
一夜傾情 3'45" (Cantonese)
Chocolate Ice 聽身體唱歌 2'45"
Sugar in the Marmalade 3'23"
夏日傾情 3'06" (Cantonese)
My Eyes Don't Lie 大綱與細節 3'20"
2004 兩個人的煙火 3'28"
Love me A Capella 你很愛我 2'35"
Superman 雙雄
Long Distance 情深說話未曾講 4'10"
不可一世 (X'mas version) 3'51" (Cantonese)
大哥 (Translated: Big Brother)

References

2005 albums
Janice Vidal albums